St Giles Church, Lincoln is a grade-II listed active parish church in St Giles, a suburb of Lincoln in Lincolnshire, England. It was built as a replacement for the former St Peter at Arches Church which was demolished in 1930. The church serves as a place of worship and community hub for the surrounding areas. The church was grade II listed in 1953 and also has a church hall for use for the local community as well as the church itself. The church also was named "the church that moved" in reference to its move after the demolition of its predecessor in the city centre.

References

Lincoln
Lincoln
Churches in Lincoln, England
Lincoln
Lincoln